Lee Seon-ae is a South Korean women jurist, who serves as Justice of the Constitutional Court of Korea since 2017. She was nominated by Supreme Court chief Yang Sung-tae and appointed by acting President Hwang Kyo-ahn. She is regarded as moderate group among nine Justices of the Constitutional Court.

Career 
1992: Judge, Seoul Civil District Court
1994: Judge, Eastern Branch of Seoul District Court
1996: Judge, Daejeon District Court
1996: Judge, Seoul District Court
2001: Judge, Seoul Administration Court
2003: Judge, Seoul High Court
2004: Seconded as Rapporteur Judge to the Constitutional Court of Korea
2006: Attorney, Yoon & Yang Limited Liability Company
2017: Justice of the Constitutional Court of Korea (since 29 March 2017)

References

External links 
 
 

1967 births
Living people
South Korean women judges
Constitutional court women judges
Justices of the Constitutional Court of Korea
Seoul National University School of Law alumni